Mission Hills is a census-designated place (CDP) in Santa Barbara County, California,  a short distance north of Lompoc on Highway 1. The population was 3,576 at the 2010 census, up from 3,142 at the 2000 census.

Geography
Mission Hills is located at  (34.689313, −120.436150).

Demographics

2010
At the 2010 census Mission Hills had a population of 3,576. The racial makeup of Mission Hills was 2,689 (75.2%) White; 91 (2.5%) African American; 74 (2.1%) Native American; 125 (3.5%) Asian; 9 (0.3%) Pacific Islander; 386 (10.8%) from other races; and 202 (5.6%) from two or more races. Hispanic or Latino of any race were 1,137 persons (31.8%).

The whole population lived in households, no one lived in non-institutionalized group quarters and no one was institutionalized.

There were 1,182 households, 447 (37.8%) had children under the age of 18 living in them, 785 (66.4%) were opposite-sex married couples living together, 115 (9.7%) had a female householder with no husband present, 65 (5.5%) had a male householder with no wife present.  There were 59 (5.0%) unmarried opposite-sex partnerships, and 2 (0.2%) same-sex married couples or partnerships. 165 households (14.0%) were one person and 94 (8.0%) had someone living alone who was 65 or older. The average household size was 3.03.  There were 965 families (81.6% of households); the average family size was 3.30.

The age distribution was 954 people (26.7%) under the age of 18, 297 people (8.3%) aged 18 to 24, 755 people (21.1%) aged 25 to 44, 1,043 people (29.2%) aged 45 to 64, and 527 people (14.7%) who were 65 or older.  The median age was 40.0 years. For every 100 females, there were 99.6 males.  For every 100 females age 18 and over, there were 97.9 males.

There were 1,223 housing units at an average density of 988.7 per square mile, of the occupied units 1,002 (84.8%) were owner-occupied and 180 (15.2%) were rented. The homeowner vacancy rate was 0.7%; the rental vacancy rate was 2.2%.  2,878 people (80.5% of the population) lived in owner-occupied housing units and 698 people (19.5%) lived in rental housing units.

2000
At the 2000 census there were 3,142 people, 1,049 households, and 869 families in the CDP. The racial makeup of the CDP was 30.22% White, 0% African American, 0% Native American, 70.69% Asian, 0% Pacific Islander, 0% from other races, and 0% from two or more races. Hispanic or Latino of any race were 0%.

Of the 1,049 households 38.5% had children under the age of 18 living with them, 69.5% were married couples living together, 9.1% had a female householder with no husband present, and 17.1% were non-families. 13.3% of households were one person and 6.7% were one person aged 65 or older.  The average household size was 2.99 and the average family size was 3.26.

The age distribution was 29.8% under the age of 18, 5.2% from 18 to 24, 26.4% from 25 to 44, 24.0% from 45 to 64, and 14.7% 65 or older.  The median age was 39 years. For every 100 females, there were 97.2 males.  For every 100 females age 18 and over, there were 94.4 males.

The median household income was $57,000 and the median family income  was $60,382. Males had a median income of $44,464 versus $30,733 for females. The per capita income for the CDP was $22,769.  About 3.9% of families and 4.8% of the population were below the poverty line, including 6.1% of those under age 18 and 1.7% of those age 65 or over.

References

Census-designated places in Santa Barbara County, California
Census-designated places in California